Stéphanie Rist (born 6 August 1973) is a French rheumatologist and politician of La République En Marche! (LREM) who has been serving as a member of the French National Assembly since the 2017 elections, representing the department of Loiret.

Political career
Rist joined LREM in 2016.

In parliament, Rist was a member of the Committee on Cultural Affairs and Education from 2017 until 2020. Since 2018, she has been serving as member of the Committee on Social Affairs. In this capacity, she authored a 2020 law on healthcare reforms amid the COVID-19 pandemic in France. Since 2022, she has been serving as the National Assembly’s lead rapporteur on the social security in France.

In addition to her committee assignments, Rist is part of a parliamentary working group on Libya.

Political positions
In July 2019, Rist voted in favor of the French ratification of the European Union’s Comprehensive Economic and Trade Agreement (CETA) with Canada.

See also
 2017 French legislative election

References

1973 births
Living people
Deputies of the 15th National Assembly of the French Fifth Republic
La République En Marche! politicians
21st-century French women politicians
People from Athis-Mons
Women members of the National Assembly (France)
Deputies of the 16th National Assembly of the French Fifth Republic
Members of Parliament for Loiret